Stadion Nesebar is a multi-purpose stadium in Nesebar, Bulgaria.  It is used for football matches and is the home ground of OFC Nesebar. The stadium holds 7,000 spectators.

Football venues in Bulgaria
Nesebar
Multi-purpose stadiums in Bulgaria
Buildings and structures in Burgas Province